The 1934 Weston-super-Mare by-election was held on 26 June 1934.  The by-election was held due to the resignation of the incumbent Conservative MP, John Erskine to become Governor of Madras Presidency.  It was won by the Conservative candidate Ian Orr-Ewing.

References

1934 in England
Weston-super-Mare
1934 elections in the United Kingdom
By-elections to the Parliament of the United Kingdom in Somerset constituencies
20th century in Somerset